The 2018 World RX of Belgium was the third round of the fifth season of the FIA World Rallycross Championship. The event was held at the Circuit Jules Tacheny Mettet in Mettet, Wallonia.

Qualifying

Semi-finals

Semi-Final 1

Semi-Final 2

Final

Standings after the event

 Note: Only the top five positions are included.

References

|- style="text-align:center"
|width="35%"|Previous race:2018 World RX of Portugal
|width="40%"|FIA World Rallycross Championship2018 season
|width="35%"|Next race:2018 World RX of Great Britain
|- style="text-align:center"
|width="35%"|Previous race:2017 World RX of Belgium
|width="40%"|World RX of Belgium
|width="35%"|Next race:2019 World RX of Benelux
|- style="text-align:center"

Belgium
World RX